Simon Kun Puoch is a South Sudanese military figure and politician. He had served as governor of Upper Nile (state) from 25 May 2010 till his removal by the President in August 2015. A Lieutenant General, he has also done work with the Southern Sudan Relief and Recovery Commission.

References

South Sudanese politicians
South Sudanese state governors
Living people
South Sudanese military personnel
People from Upper Nile (state)
Year of birth missing (living people)